Wigan Chapel Lane railway station served the town of Wigan in Lancashire, England.

Wigan Branch Railway

The station building was located to the south of the running line adjacent to Chapel Lane, no other details are known. The station was only known as Wigan and Chapel Lane was added in an explanatory way as to the location of the Railway's office.

Goods station
After closure in 1838 the station site became Wigan goods station. The goods station and yard gradually expanded until there were three sheds, it was able to accommodate most types of goods including live stock, and was equipped with a ten-ton crane. Sometime between 1938 and 1956 the yard lost its capacity to deal with livestock and its crane was downgraded to one of four tons.

The goods yard was still in use in 1957 but by 2008 the goods sheds had been demolished and the goods yard site was occupied by a retail warehouse and car park.

References

Notes

Citations

Bibliography

Disused railway stations in the Metropolitan Borough of Wigan
Railway stations in Great Britain opened in 1832
Railway stations in Great Britain closed in 1838